Egley is a surname. Notable people with the surname include:

William Egley (1798–1870), English painter
William Maw Egley (1826–1916), English artist, son of William

See also
Égly, France